Kim Bolduc is the Deputy Special Representative of United Nations Stabilization Mission in the Democratic Republic of Congo (MONUSCO). She served previously as the head of the United Nations Mission for the Referendum in Western Sahara (MINURSO) and the Deputy Special Representative for the United Nations Stabilization Mission in Haiti (MINUSTAH). In tandem, she will be also the United Nations Resident and Humanitarian Coordinator.  She has previously held other positions with the United Nations.

References

External links 
MONUSCO
UN Biography Kim Bolduc

Living people
United Nations Development Programme officials
University of Ottawa alumni
Canadian officials of the United Nations
Year of birth missing (living people)